Events from the year 1890 in Russia.

Incumbents
 Monarch – Alexander III

Events

 
 
 
 Eastern journey of Nicholas II
 Gugunian Expedition
 Armenian Revolutionary Federation
 Haji Alakbar Mosque
 Rakvere Lihakombinaat
 Saint Petersburg Mathematical Society

Births

Deaths

References

1890 in Russia
Years of the 19th century in the Russian Empire